A list of British films released in 1935.

1935

See also
 1935 in British music
 1935 in British television
 1935 in the United Kingdom

References

External links
 

1935
Films
Lists of 1935 films by country or language
1930s in British cinema